Follow Through Magnet School (formerly School 8) is a former elementary school in Buffalo, New York. It served Grades K through 8 and was located at the corner of East Utica Street and Masten Avenue in the city's East Side. It closed in 2004, although it has served as a swing school for other schools that are being reconstructed.

History 
School 8 was built in 1838 at the corners of Franklin and Church Streets, the first school building that was built under the reorganized Buffalo Public Schools district. It came under criticism for its construction as its elaborate design and front pillars were more than required for the new school system. This building would be closed in 1883 due to a lack of enrollment, and the number 8 was transferred to a new school built in the growing East Side. In 1918, this building was destroyed by fire and replaced the following year by the current building. An addition was built to the school in 1961, and had a name change in 1976 as part of the desegregation plan. The building was closed in 2004 due to budget cuts, but served as a swing school for Dr. Martin Luther King Jr. Multicultural Institute, City Honors High School, and School 81 while their home buildings were being reconstructed. The building may be used to house Middle Early College High School and Buffalo's Adult Learning Program beginning with the 2013–2014 school year

Former principals 
Previous assignment and reason for departure denoted in parenthesis
Ms. Ellen C. Bragg
Mr. Silas Sweet
Mr. Edward L. Chamberlyn
Mr. Samuel Slade
Mr. George H. Stowits
Ms. Ella D. Barker
Mr. Dwight D. Walbridge
Ms. Elsie A. Gazlag
Mr. Byron Heath
Mr. Francis B. Snavely
Ms. Marie B. Mockler
Mr. Harold D. Axelrod–?-1966
Mr. Donald Beck–1966-1991
Ms. Margaret A. Forrester–1991-2001 (Principal - Campus West School, retired)
Ms. Kathleen Franklin–2001-2004 (Principal - School 82, named Principal of Poplar E.C.C. 11)

Selected former assistant principals 
Previous assignment and reason for departure denoted in parentheses
Ms. Anne Britt–?-1971 (Teacher - Buffalo Public Schools, retired)
Mr. Joseph N. Ward–?-1989 (unknown, retired)
Ms. June Clark–?-2004 (unknown, named Assistant Principal of Community School 53)

References 

Defunct schools in New York (state)
Magnet schools in Buffalo, New York
Public elementary schools in New York (state)
Schools in Buffalo, New York